Cho Nam-suk (born August 13, 1981) is a male South Korean judoka.

At the 2005 World Judo Championships in Cairo he won a bronze medal in the extra lightweight competition.

He won a gold medal at the -60 kg category of the 2005 Asian Judo Championships in Tashkent.

References

External links
 Profile and results from Judoinside

1981 births
Living people
Asian Games medalists in judo
Judoka at the 2006 Asian Games
South Korean male judoka
Asian Games silver medalists for South Korea

Medalists at the 2006 Asian Games
Universiade medalists in judo
Universiade bronze medalists for South Korea
21st-century South Korean people